Nicofuranose is a niacin derivative used as a hypolipidemic agent.

References

Monosaccharide derivatives
Nicotinate esters